Fernando Martín Espina (March 25, 1962 – December 3, 1989) was a Spanish professional basketball player who was considered to be one of the best Spanish basketball players ever. Martín was 2.06 m (6 ft 9 in) tall, and he played primarily at the center and power forward positions. He was considered a talented all-around athlete. He was a five-time swimming champion in Spain, as well as being a highly ranked athlete in the sports of handball, table tennis and judo.

Martín wore the number 10 jersey, which Real Madrid retired after his death. He was named one of FIBA's 50 Greatest Players, in 1991. In 2007, he was enshrined into the FIBA Hall of Fame.

Professional career
Martín was the first Spanish player to play in the National Basketball Association (NBA), in 1986, and was also the second European to play in the league.  He played for the Portland Trail Blazers and, earlier, in Spain for Estudiantes and Real Madrid. He played in only 24 games in the 1986–87 NBA season for the Blazers, being injured for two months. At the end of the season, he returned to Spain, to play again for Real Madrid.

National team career
Martín also played for the senior Spanish national team, and he was a prominent player in the Spanish team that won the silver medal at the 1984 Los Angeles Summer Olympic Games. Martín also represented his country at the 1981 EuroBasket, the 1983 EuroBasket, where he won a silver medal, and the 1985 EuroBasket, where he was selected to the All-Tournament Team.

Death
Martín died in a car accident in the M-30 motorway in Madrid, after crashing his car. His death caused an enormous shock in Spanish basketball.

Personal life
His son, Jan Martín, made a start in the top-tier level Spanish pro league, the ACB, with Estudiantes, in the 2002–03 season, and he also played with the Spanish national junior teams. His nephew, Dominick Martín, played college basketball at Yale University, and also played professionally in Spain. His brother, Antonio Martín Espina, was also a professional basketball player.

For his first dunk in the 2009 NBA All-Star Slam Dunk Contest, Portland Trail Blazers' player Rudy Fernández, wore a #10 Martín Blazers jersey, in his honor.

See also
 List of basketball players who died during their careers

References

External links
 
 Fernando Martín at realmadrid.com
 Fernando Martín at acb.com 
 Fernando Martín at feb.es 
 
 
 
 

1962 births
1989 deaths
1986 FIBA World Championship players
Basketball players at the 1984 Summer Olympics
Basketball players from Madrid
CB Estudiantes players
Centers (basketball)
FIBA Hall of Fame inductees
Liga ACB players
Medalists at the 1984 Summer Olympics
National Basketball Association players from Spain
New Jersey Nets draft picks
Power forwards (basketball)
Olympic basketball players of Spain
Olympic medalists in basketball
Olympic silver medalists for Spain
Portland Trail Blazers players
Real Madrid Baloncesto players
Road incident deaths in Spain
Spanish expatriate basketball people in the United States